The 2015 Presbyterian Blue Hose football team represented Presbyterian College in the 2015 NCAA Division I FCS football season. They were led by seventh-year head coach Harold Nichols and played their home games at Bailey Memorial Stadium. They were a member of the Big South Conference. They finished the season 2–9, 1–5 in Big South play to finish in last place.

Schedule

Source: Schedule

Game summaries

at Miami (OH)

at Charlotte

Campbell

Chattanooga

at Western Carolina

at Coastal Carolina

Charleston Southern

Gardner–Webb

at Liberty

at Monmouth

Kennesaw State

References

Presbyterian
Presbyterian Blue Hose football seasons
Presbyterian Blue Hose football